Club Baloncesto Ciudad de Huelva was a professional basketball team based in Huelva, Andalucia. The last season, (2007–08) the team played in  LEB Oro.

History
CB Ciudad de Huelva was founded in 1996. In their first season, they win the LEB League and they are promoted to the 1996-97 ACB League. They only play one year and they are relegated in they play-out.

Ciudad de Huelva continues playing in LEB until 2008, year where they disappear due to the enormous debts. The club was immediately replaced by the new creation CD Huelva Baloncesto.

Season by season

Trophies and awards

Trophies
LEB: (1)
1997

References

External links
Federación Española de Baloncesto
Ciudad de Huelva Official Page

Defunct basketball teams in Spain
Basketball teams established in 1996
Basketball teams disestablished in 2008
Basketball teams in Andalusia
Former Liga ACB teams
Former LEB Oro teams
Former LEB Plata teams
Sport in Huelva